Praia de Iracema (lit. "Iracema Beach") is a beach and a neighborhood located in the Brazilian city of Fortaleza in the state of Ceará. Its name comes from the character Iracema that gives name to a famous novel by the cearense writer José de Alencar.

In the past the locality was called Porto das Jangadas (lit. "Jangadas Port") and then Praia do Peixe (lit. "Fish Beach"), now Praia de Iracema. Until 1947, it was the port area of Fortaleza, with loading and unloading of goods and people through the Ponte Metálica (lit. "Metallic Bridge"), deactivated after the construction of the Port of Mucuripe. Today it is a bohemian neighborhood of the city.

Photos gallery

References

Neighbourhoods in Fortaleza
Landforms of Ceará
Beaches of Brazil